FC Volgar-Astrakhan Astrakhan was a Russian football team from Astrakhan. It played in the Russian Second Division in the 2012–13 season.

Volgar-Astrakhan was the reserves team of FC Volgar Astrakhan.

External links
  Official site 

Association football clubs established in 1996
1996 establishments in Russia
Association football clubs disestablished in 2013
2013 disestablishments in Russia
Defunct football clubs in Russia
Sport in Astrakhan
FC Volgar Astrakhan